Anina is a 2013 Uruguayan-Colombian animated film directed by Alfredo Soderguit. The film was selected as the Uruguayan entry for the Best Foreign Language Film at the 86th Academy Awards, but it was not nominated.

Plot
Anina Yatay Salas is a pensive redhead who really does not like her name, with each part of it being palindrome. Her peers always ridicule her about this, especially Anina’s arch-enemy Yisel. When these two get into a playground fight one day they are sent to the school head who disciplines them with a nerve-racking punishment: they are both given a sealed black envelope which they are not allowed to open for an entire week. Haunted by nightmares, the days drag by endlessly for Anina. She and her inquisitive best friend try to devise all sorts of ways to discover what is inside the envelope. Gradually, Anina begins to realise that not only does Yisel share her fate: she also has much bigger problems to contend with than Anina. Tentatively, the two rivals begin to get to know each other. Narrated by the voice of the young protagonist, the film is able to follow Anina’s thought processes and provide an insight into her emotional world. Anina’s day-dreams are not always about her troubles and woes – they also reflect her awakening feelings of love.

Cast
 Federica Lacaño as Anina Yatay Salas
 María Mendive as Mother of Anina
 César Troncoso as Father of Anina
 Cristina Morán as The Director
 Petru Valensky as Tota
 Roberto Suárez as Pocha

See also
 List of submissions to the 86th Academy Awards for Best Foreign Language Film
 List of Uruguayan submissions for the Academy Award for Best Foreign Language Film

References

External links
 

2013 films
2013 animated films
Flash animated films
Colombian animated films
2010s Spanish-language films
Uruguayan animated films